Shukayevka is a rural locality (a settlement) and the administrative center of Shukayevskoye Rural Settlement, Verkhnekhavsky District, Voronezh Oblast, Russia. The population was 593 as of 2010. There are 4 streets.

Geography 
Shukayevka is located 20 km east of Verkhnyaya Khava (the district's administrative centre) by road. Plyasovatka is the nearest rural locality.

References 

Rural localities in Verkhnekhavsky District
Voronezhsky Uyezd